Sebastien Alexandre Grainger (born 11 April 1979) is a Canadian singer and musician, best known as drummer and singer of the alternative rock duo Death from Above and the singer and guitarist for his band Sebastien Grainger and The Mountains. He is part owner of Giant Studios in Toronto, Ontario with Jimmy Shaw of Metric.

Solo career
Sebastien signed with Saddle Creek Records in the USA, Outside Music in Canada and JVC in Japan to release his debut solo album, entitled "Sebastien Grainger & The Mountains", which was released on 21 October 2008. It was recorded between Giant Studio in Toronto and Mountain City Studio in Montreal. Grainger wrote and performed nearly all the parts on the record with the exception of a few songs that were recorded as a full band. He is currently playing shows across North America. When performing live, Grainger is joined by bassist Nick Sewell, drummer Leon Taheny and synthesiser and guitar player Andrew Scott. Together they have toured with Bloc Party, Metric, Hot Hot Heat & Albert Hammond Jr.

In 2009 Sebastien Grainger took part in an interactive documentary series called City Sonic. The series, which featured 20 Toronto artists, had him discuss his past experiences with the El Mocambo.

Other projects

Death from Above 1979 
Grainger is best known to the public for being the singer and drummer in the duo Death from Above 1979, with bassist Jesse F. Keeler. The "1979" on the end of the band's name originated from Grainger's birth year, which he has tattooed on his forearm. Death from Above 1979 broke up in 2006, citing personal and artistic differences between the two members of the band. However, on 5 February 2011, Grainger officially announced that the band had reformed, and they since have been playing shows worldwide.

The Rhythm Method
The Rhythm Method is Grainger's dance/computer music alias. He has released one double a-side 7" in the UK for the songs "Renegade Silence/When You Go Out" available from 50 Bones Records.  An alternate mix of "Renegade Silence" will be available on Grainger's LP "Sebastien Grainger & The Mountains" labeled as "featuring The Rhythm Method".

Girl on Girl
Grainger has released remixes for Death from Above's "Black History Month" and Metric's "Poster of a Girl" under the alias "Girl on Girl", a collaboration with The Mountains' Leon Taheny.  Earlier similar electronic works were once available, under the aliases "The Great White Hype" and "Synsonic Pro-Model", through a dedicated Myspace page, that has since vanished.

Bad †i†s / Deserts 
Bad Tits is Sebastien Grainger's band with Joshua Reichmann, formerly of Jewish Legend and Tangiers. The duo began playing shows in early 2010, with Grainger on drums and samplers, Reichmann on guitar and keyboards, and both singing. They released a debut vinyl 7" and digital EP titled Garbage Night on the label Hand Drawn Dracula. On February 26, 2012, Grainger announced on his Twitter account that Bad Tits had changed their name to Deserts. Desert's Twitter account posted about having been recording music shortly after.

Collaborations and contributions
 Grainger's voice was featured in the Does It Offend You, Yeah? song "Let's Make Out".
 He contributed drums to the track "Sunday Morning" by Canadian hip-hop artist k-os. He appears in the song's music video as a homeless man who is recruited as a drummer.
 He has collaborated with rising French electronica artist DatA. Their first single together, "Rapture", is available now. Other collaborations will follow on DatA's debut full-length release, including "One in a Million" on 28 April 2009.
 Grainger played drums both live and on one record for Keeler's pre-Death From Above 1979 solo project Femme Fatale.
 He contributed backing vocals to "Twice Born", a song on The Chemistry of Common Life, Toronto hardcore punk band Fucked Up's 2008 LP.
 He collaborated with Canadian rapper k-os on the song "BlackWater" off his mixtape The Anchorman Mixtape.
 He provided vocals for the song "Water in Hell" by the Canadian indie rock band Broken Social Scene on their album Forgiveness Rock Record.
 In 2011, he participated in the National Parks Project, collaborating with musicians Jennifer Castle and Dan Werb, and filmmaker Catherine Martin, to produce and score a short documentary film about Mingan Archipelago National Park Reserve in Quebec.
 Grainger collaborated with artist Zowie on the track "Love or Hate (Zowie VS Sebastien Grainger)".
 Grainger also produced two of the tracks on fellow Canadian band Nightbox's debut EP.
 Grainger's voice sample is used in "Untrust Us" by Crystal Castles.
 He provided vocals on the song "H.U.N.T." by Felix Cartal.
 Grainger was featured on the song “Cheap Magic” by Turbowolf

Discography
Femme Fatale
 2002 Fire Baptism (EP)
Death from Above

Note: Sebastien Grainger has performed on all Death From Above recordings to date. Only studio albums have been listed here, for a more complete list of releases see Death from Above discography.
 2004 You're a Woman, I'm a Machine
 2014 The Physical World 
 2017 Outrage! Is Now
 2021 Is 4 Lovers
American Lips
 2017 Kiss the Void
Solo
 2008 American Names (Digital EP/7" Vinyl)
 2008 Sebastien Grainger & The Mountains
 2008 DatA feat. Sebastien Grainger - Rapture (EP)
 2009 DatA feat. Sebastien Grainger - One in a Million (EP)
 2013 Going With You (EP)
 2013 Yours to Discover
The Rhythm Method
 2008 Renegade Silence/When You Go Out (7" vinyl double A-side)
 2009 Finish Me Off (EP)

References

External links

 Sebastien Grainger

1979 births
Living people
Canadian indie rock musicians
Canadian rock drummers
Canadian rock singers
Franco-Ontarian people
Canadian male drummers
Musicians from Mississauga
21st-century Canadian drummers
21st-century Canadian male singers
Saddle Creek Records artists
679 Artists artists